John Miles Taylor (1925-2005) was a Grey Cup champion Canadian Football League player. He played offensive end.

A native Montrealer, Taylor played football with Westhill High School, and later attended McGill University. He enlisted in the Navy during the Second World War. He first won the Grey Cup with the champion St. Hyacinthe-Donnacona Navy team, and scored that game's only touchdown. He was a player with the inaugural Montreal Alouettes in 1946 and was part of the Larks first Grey Cup championship. He played 38 games for the Als over 5 seasons.

References

1925 births
2005 deaths
Anglophone Quebec people
Players of Canadian football from Quebec
Montreal Alouettes players
McGill Redbirds football players
McGill University alumni
Canadian football people from Montreal
St. Hyacinthe-Donnacona Navy football players